Reynaldo Gonda Evangelista OFS (born May 8, 1960) is a Filipino prelate and a professed member of the Franciscan Order who is the current bishop of the Roman Catholic Diocese of Imus appointed by Pope Francis on April 8, 2013, his first appointment in the Philippines. He replaced Bishop Luis Antonio Tagle after he was installed as the Archbishop of Manila in December 2011. Evangelista was installed as the fifth Bishop of Imus on June 5, 2013. He previously served as the third Bishop of Boac in Marinduque province from December 11, 2004, until his appointment to Imus.

Early life and family
Evangelista was born on May 8, 1960, in Brgy. San Jose in Mabini, Batangas province. His father, Benjamin C. Evangelista, of Brgy. San Jose, and his mother, Rufina G. Gonda, of Brgy. Talaga, both originated from Mabini, Batangas. Reynaldo is the fifth among the nine siblings: his only brother Antonio, and his seven sisters Teresita (Roga), Melba (del Espiritu Santo), Evelyn (Llanes), Gloria (Sanchez), Rosita (Atienza), Cecilia (Ferrer) and Lea (Aspi). His father died on January 18, 1983.

Education
Evangelista attended primary school in 1967 at the Anilao Elementary School in Anilao, Batangas. He attended intermediate school in 1970 at the Mabini Central Elementary School. He went on to continue his high school education at the St. Francis de Sales Minor Seminary in Lipa City.

After high school, Evangelista entered the seminary in 1977 majoring in philosophy at the St. Francis de Sales Regional College Seminary in Brgy. Marawoy, Lipa City. He majored in theology in 1981 at the St. Alphonsus School of Theology in Lucena City in Quezon province. After his ordination in 1986, he took pastoral counseling in 1987 at the Summer Institute of the Ateneo de Manila University. He traveled in 1998 to Rome, Italy, to attend the course on Seminary Formation at the Pontifical Athenaeum Regina Apostolorum, During these studies he joined the Franciscan Order.

Ordination
Evangelista was ordained a deacon on February 26, 1986, at the Carmel of St. Joseph Monastery in Lucena City by Ruben T. Profugo, Bishop of Lucena. He was ordained a priest on June 19, 1986, at the San Sebastian Cathedral in Lipa City by Mariano G. Gaviola, Archbishop of Lipa.

Evangelista was appointed Bishop of Boac on December 11, 2004. On January 26, 2005, at the San Sebastian Cathedral in Lipa City, he was consecrated bishop by Antonio Franco, the apostolic nuncio to the Philippines. He was installed on February 22, 2005.

Bishop of Imus

Evangelista was installed as the fifth Bishop of Imus on June 5, 2013. The installation Mass was led by the Apostolic Nuncio to the Philippines, Archbishop Giuseppe Pinto, at the Imus Cathedral. The current Manila archbishop, Cardinal Luis Antonio Tagle, Evangelista's predecessor, along with Manila archbishop-emeritus Cardinal Gaudencio Rosales and Cebu archbishop-emeritus Cardinal Ricardo Vidal, were present.

Ministries as a priest
1986-1995 – Professor at the St. Francis de Sales Minor Seminary in Lipa City
1986-1987 – Assistant Prefect of Discipline, St. Francis de Sales Minor Seminary, Lipa City
1987-1990 – Assistant Spiritual Director, St. Francis de Sales Minor Seminary, Lipa City
1987-1993 – Moderator, Association of Lipa Archdiocesan Seminarians
1988-1990 – Assistant Director, Archdiocesan Youth Commission
1990-1991 – Vice Rector, St. Francis de Sales Minor Seminary, Lipa City
1991-1995 – Rector, St. Francis de Sales Minor Seminary, Lipa City
1991-1995 – Ex Officio Member, Archdiocesan Council of Priests (Presbyteral Council)
1992-1997 – Member, Archdiocesan Board of Consultors
1994-2000 – Ordinary Confessor, Missionary Catechists of the Sacred Heart (MCSH), Sabang, Lipa City
1995-2000 – Rector of St. Francis de Sales Regional College Seminary, Marawoy, Lipa City
1995-2000 – Ex Officio Member – Archdiocesan Council of Priests (Presbyteral Council)
1997 – Member, Commission on Clergy, Archdiocese of Lipa
1998 – Board Member – Kapisanan ni San Francisco de Sales
1999 – Director – Kapisanan ni San Francisco de Sales
2000-2004 – Parish Priest, San Guillermo Parish, Talisay, Batangas
2000-2004 – Director and Chaplain, San Guillermo Academy, Talisay, Batangas
2001-2003 – Elected Member of the Archdiocesan Council of Priests, Archdiocese of Lipa
2004 – Rector of St. Francis de Sales Regional College Seminary, Marawoy, Lipa City
2004 – Chairman of the Commission on Clergy, Archdiocese of Lipa
2004 – Elected Member of the Archdiocesan Council of Priests, Archdiocese of Lipa

Ministries as bishop
2005–present – Member of the Board of Trustees of St. Alphonsus Regional Seminary, Lucena City
2005–present – Honorary chairman of the Marinduque Council For Environmental Concerns (MACEC)
2005-2009 – Member of the Office on Women, Catholic Bishops' Conference of the Philippines (CBCP)
2005–present – Member of the Episcopal Commission on Seminaries, Catholic Bishops’ Conference of the Philippines (CBCP)
2009–present – Member of the Board of Directors of the Dechant Foundation in Dodge City, Kansas, U.S.A.
2009-2011 – Member of the Episcopal Commission on Clergy, Catholic Bishops’ Conference of the Philippines (CBCP)
2009–present – President of Commission on Vocations, Catholic Bishops’ Conference of the Philippines (CBCP)
2011–present – Member of the Permanent Council, Catholic Bishops’ Conference of the Philippines (CBCP)
2012–present – Member, Board of Trustees, Pondo ng Pinoy Community Foundation, Inc.

References

External links
Diocese of Boac

1960 births
Living people
People from Batangas
Franciscan bishops
21st-century Roman Catholic bishops in the Philippines
Roman Catholic bishops of Imus